Linda Scott (born Linda Joy Sampson; June 1, 1945) is an American pop singer and actress who was active from the late 1950s to the early 1970s. Her biggest hit was the 1961 million-selling single, "I've Told Every Little Star".  She went on to place twelve songs on the charts over the next four years, the last being "Who’s Been Sleeping In My Bed," inspired by the film and written by Hal David and Burt Bacharach. In 1962, she portrayed a fictionalized version of herself in the musical film Don't Knock the Twist.

Biography
Born in Queens, New York, Linda Sampson was 11 years old when she moved with her family to Teaneck, New Jersey. 
According to syndicated columnist Dick Kleiner, when Sampson was 13, she read a local newspaper article about songwriter Jane Douglass White. Sampson wrote White (also a New Jersey resident), the two were introduced, and White helped produce a demonstration cut which helped Sampson get attention, White playing piano on the record. She was still in (Teaneck High School) when she auditioned to appear on Arthur Godfrey's popular CBS Radio show in 1959. After having won a place on the show, Sampson and other young performers became regular guests. During the show's run, the singer came to the attention of Epic Records, and made her recording debut (singing as Linda Sampson) with the single, "In-Between Teen".

Though still in high school, in 1961 she signed with Canadian-American Records, which had struck gold with the Santo & Johnny's "Sleep Walk". The label changed her performing name to Linda Scott, producing and releasing the hit "I've Told Every Little Star," a standard written by Oscar Hammerstein II and Jerome Kern for their 1932 production Music In The Air. The track sold over one million copies, earning a gold disc for Scott.

Scott's three biggest hits came in that first year, with "I've Told Every Little Star" (U.S. #3), "I Don't Know Why" (U.S. #12), and "Don't Bet Money Honey" (U.S. #9). The first two were standards, while the third was one of Scott's own compositions.
Scott also charted with a song that peaked at #44 on the Billboard charts, "Starlight, Starbright". It was mostly a regional hit played in the Northeast. It reached #44 in August of 1961.

Scott was the showcase artist when Canadian-American started a subsidiary label, Congress Records, in 1962, and in fact both labels released new material of hers simultaneously. The following year, she sang her hit "Yessirree" in the Chubby Checker film, Don't Knock the Twist.    
  
In 1963, American Bandstand signed Scott to Dick Clark's Caravan of Stars national U.S. tour which was scheduled to perform its 15th show on the night of November 22, 1963 at the Memorial Auditorium in Dallas, Texas until the Friday evening event had to be suddenly cancelled moments after U.S. President John F. Kennedy was assassinated that afternoon while touring Dallas in an open car caravan.
 
Scott's final U.S. chart appearance was "Who's Been Sleeping In My Bed," released in January 1964, the same month that The Beatles made their first chart appearance. In 1965, she became a cast member of the variety show Where the Action Is, which she co-hosted with singer Steve Alaimo. Her last U.S. recording, "They Don't Know You", was released in 1967 on RCA Records. She continued to record as a backing vocalist (most notably on Lou Christie's 1969 hit, "I'm Gonna Make You Mine") before finally quitting show business in the early 1970s.

In 2022, Scott's hit I've Told Ev'ry Little Star was featured in an advert for store H&M, reaching a whole new generation of fans to her music.

Personal life
Scott was an army laboratory technician for two years, stationed in Fort Sam Houston, Texas, and received a degree in Theology from Kingsway Christian College and Theological Seminary in Des Moines, Iowa, according to an interview she gave to Goldmine in 1987. During her time in the army, she met and married a fellow serviceman. The marriage produced one child in 1973 and ended in divorce. She later taught music at the Christian Academy in New York City. 

The compilation CD, The Complete Hits of Linda Scott, was released by Eric Records in 1995;  while her recording of "I've Told Every Little Star" was included in director David Lynch's film, Mulholland Drive.

Discography

Albums

Singles

Filmography

Film

References

External links
 The Complete Hits of Linda Scott
 Profile at Allmusic.com
 

1945 births
Living people
People from Queens, New York
American women pop singers
Epic Records artists
Kapp Records artists
RCA Victor artists
Singers from New Jersey
Singers from New York (state)
Teaneck High School alumni
21st-century American women